Elk Lick Lodge, also known as the Remann Cabin, was built in 1926 by local settler and builder Grant Humes for Frederick Remann as a personal fishing retreat in what became Olympic National Park in the U.S. state of Washington. It was originally built next to the Elwha River, but was moved to higher ground in 1939 to escape the threat of flooding. With the H.H. Botten cabin it is one of only two private fishing cabins to have survived from pre-park days, both built by Humes.

Frederick Remann was a Tacoma, Washington resident. An attorney, he was a Pierce County Superior Court judge from 1926 to 1948. Remann and friends and family used the cabin until his death in 1949.

The roof and gable are covered with cedar shingles.

The cabin was listed on the National Register of Historic Places on July 13, 2007.

References

Houses on the National Register of Historic Places in Washington (state)
Houses completed in 1926
Buildings and structures in Jefferson County, Washington
National Register of Historic Places in Olympic National Park
Rustic architecture in Washington (state)
National Register of Historic Places in Jefferson County, Washington
Log buildings and structures on the National Register of Historic Places in Washington (state)
1926 establishments in Washington (state)